Coastal-class ferries, also known as the "Super-C class", are currently the largest double-ended ferries in the world, while the two single-ended Spirit-class ferries are the largest in the BC Ferries fleet. These vessels are owned and operated by BC Ferries of British Columbia, Canada and were built at the Flensburger Schiffbau-Gesellschaft shipyard in Flensburg, Germany.

The three ferries (and ) were acquired by BC Ferries to replace the aging V-class ferries. They operate on the three busiest routes connecting the Lower Mainland to Vancouver Island—Tsawwassen↔Swartz Bay, Tsawwassen↔Duke Point, and Horseshoe Bay↔Departure Bay.

Description
The Coastal class of ferries is composed of three ships, Coastal Renaissance, Coastal Inspiration and Coastal Celebration. At launch they were the largest double-ended ferries in the world. Coastal Renaissance has a deadweight tonnage (DWT) of 2,366, Coastal Inspiration, a DWT of 1,770 and Coastal Celebration, a DWT of 2,350.

The ships are powered by four 8-cylinder MaK 8M32C diesel engines driving two  electric motors turning two controllable pitch propellers. The engines are split into two main compartments and each compartment can run independently. The vessel has seven decks, with the passenger deck on Deck 6, above the two bridges on Deck 5, with additional passenger spaces on Deck 5, between the two bridges. The class has a capacity of 1,604 passengers and crew and  lane space for 310 full-sized family vehicles. Initial reports stated the vessels could carry 1,650 passengers and crew and 370 cars. Amenities aboard each ferry include a Coastal Cafe, a Coast Cafe Express, Sitka Coffee Place, lounge, gift shop, and children's and pet areas.

Ships in class

Acquisition and service

The vessels were ordered from Flensburger Schiffbau-Gesellschaft shipyard in Flensburg, Germany in September 2004 for €206.4 million. According to BC Ferries at this time, this was 40 percent lower than the lowest Canadian shipyard's bid. This was a controversial decision, which led to Canadian shipbuilders protesting the decision. The first new Coastal-class vessel, Coastal Renaissance, departed for British Columbia on October 27, 2007, and arrived on December 13, 2007. She entered service on the Departure Bay to Horseshoe Bay run on March 8, 2008. She was followed by Coastal Inspiration, which left Germany on February 9 and arrived March 25, and Coastal Celebration, which departed on May 9 and arrived on June 18. The vessels' names were based on submissions received during a "naming contest" in late 2005.

Coastal Renaissance operates on the Swartz Bay to Tsawassen route in winter and Departure Bay to Horseshoe Bay during the summer. Coastal Inspiration operates on the Duke Point to Tsawassen route. Coastal Celebration travels along the Swartz Bay to Tsawassen route. Coastal Inspiration was then redirected to the Departure Bay terminal with the assistance of a tugboat to disembark passengers and vehicles. The ship was out of service for 122 days. The cause of the crash was later found to be crew error.

References

External links
BC Ferries Newbuild Program

 
Ships built in Flensburg
Ferry classes